Derwent Park Road is a major link road that connects the Brooker Highway to the Main Road, in the northern suburbs of Hobart, Tasmania. The Road starts at Main Road, Derwent Park and continues East across the Brooker Highway, ending at the Hobart Zinc Works. The road serves in excess of 14,000 vehicles per day.

See also

References

Streets in Hobart